Neiafu is the name of several places in Polynesia:

Tonga
Neiafu (Vava'u) – the second largest town in Tonga, located on Vava'u island.
Neiafu (Tongatapu) – a small village at the western end of Tongatapu island.

Samoa
Neiafu (Samoa) – a village on Savai'i island.